{{Automatic taxobox
| fossil_range = Early-Late Miocene (Colhuehuapian-Huayquerian) ~
| image = Perimys tooth.png
| image_caption = Left m1 and m2 of Perimys sp.
| taxon = Perimys
| authority = Ameghino, 1887
| type_species = Perimys erutus
| type_species_authority = Ameghino, 1887
| subdivision_ranks = Species
| subdivision = *P. ameghinoi 
P. dissimilis 
P. erutus 
P. impactus 
P. incavatus P. incurvus P. intermedius P. oemulus P. onustus P. pacificus P. perpinguis P. planaris P. puellus P. pueraster P. scalabrinianus P. transversus 
| synonyms = Sphodromys 
}}Perimys is an extinct genus of neoepiblemid rodent that lived from the Early to Late Miocene in what is now South America. Fossils have been found in the Cerro Bandera, Cerro Boleadoras, Ituzaingó, Santa Cruz, and Sarmiento Formations of Argentina,
and the Galera, Santa Cruz and Río Frías Formations of Chile.

 Description Perimys was a medium to large-sized rodent. Perimys can be distinguished from other caviomorphs in having euhypsodont and bilophodont cheek teeth, with the hypoflexus/id being conspicuously broader and filled with more cementum than in Prolagostomus and Pliolagostomus. As a result, the teeth of Perimys have a U-shape occlusal outline.

 Taxonomy Perimys was first described by Florentino Ameghino in 1887 based on remains found in the Santa Cruz Formation of Argentina, with the proposed type species being Perimys erutus. Several other species have been described as pertaining to this genus. Ameghino originally assigned it to the obsolete family Eryomyidae, however, many later authors have assigned it to the Neoepiblemidae family.

The following cladogram of the Caviomorpha is based on Busker et al. 2020, showing the position of Perimys''.

References 

Hystricognath rodents
Miocene rodents
Miocene mammals of South America
Colhuehuapian
Santacrucian
Friasian
Colloncuran
Laventan
Mayoan
Chasicoan
Huayquerian
Neogene Argentina
Fossils of Argentina
Fossil taxa described in 1887
Prehistoric rodent genera
Austral or Magallanes Basin
Golfo San Jorge Basin
Neuquén Basin
Paraná Basin
Santa Cruz Formation
Sarmiento Formation
Cerro Bandera Formation
Ituzaingó Formation